William Morgan was a Welsh politician who sat in the House of Commons  in 1640.

Family 
Morgan is the fourth child of Sir William Morgan  of Tredegar, MP for Monmouthshire in 1624. Morgan is the third child of Sir William Morgan's second wife Bridget Morgan widow of Anthony Morgan of Llanfihangael Crucorney and daughter of Anthony Morgan of Heyford Northamptonshire.

Education 
He studied at the Middle Temple.

Political career 
In April 1640, he was elected MP for Monmouthshire in the Short Parliament.

References

Year of birth missing
Year of death missing
17th-century Welsh politicians
Members of the Middle Temple
English MPs 1640 (April)
Members of the Parliament of England (pre-1707) for constituencies in Wales